Mariana Gomes Ferreira Lima-Díaz (born August 25, 1972) is a Brazilian actress and producer.

Personal life

Since 1997, she has been married to director Enrique Díaz, with whom she has two daughters, Elena and Antônia.

Filmography

Television

Films

Theater

References

External links 

1972 births
Living people
Actresses from São Paulo
Brazilian television actresses
Brazilian telenovela actresses
Brazilian film actresses
Brazilian stage actresses